The teams competing in Group 8 of the 2004 UEFA European Under-21 Championships qualifying competition were Belgium, Croatia, Bulgaria and Estonia.

Standings

Matches
All times are CET.

Goalscorers
4 goals
 Darijo Srna

3 goals
 Emil Gargorov

2 goals

 Thomas Chatelle
 Koen Daerden
 Önder Turaci
 Aleksandar Mladenov

1 goal

 Jonathan Blondel
 Hans Cornelis
 Serge Djamba-Shango
 Yordan Todorov
 Aleksandar Tunchev
 Dino Drpić
 Mario Lučić
 Niko Kranjčar
 Danijel Popović
 Nikola Šafarić
 Joel Lindpere
 Sander Post
 Ingemar Teever
 Vjatšeslav Zahovaiko

1 own goal
 Radoslav Mitrevski (playing against Belgium)

External links
 Group 8 at UEFA.com

Group 8
Under